The British Racing Drivers' Club (BRDC) is an exclusive invitation-only members club for racecar drivers who are judged to have achieved success in the upper levels of motor sport for a number of seasons. Except under exceptional circumstances, members must have been born in the United Kingdom or Commonwealth. The BRDC owns and operates Silverstone Circuit in the United Kingdom.

Early days
The club was founded in April 1928 by Dr. J. Dudley Benjafield, one of an informal group of British racing drivers known as the "Bentley Boys". The BRDC began primarily as a socialising club for Benjafield and his fellow drivers, but by the time of its inauguration, its 25 members had devised a set of objectives for the club:

To promote the interests of motor sport generally.
To celebrate any specific achievement in motor sport.
To extend hospitality to racing drivers from overseas.
To further the interests of British drivers competing abroad.

In 1929, the BRDC became involved in the promotion and organisation of racing events. Its first event was the BRDC 500-Mile Race at Brooklands on 12 October of that year, a race won by a Bentley 4½ Litre, unsupercharged, owned and driven by Bentley-dealer Jack Barclay and Le Mans-winner F.C. Clement. The event was such a success that the 1930 event, scheduled for 4 October, was accorded International status. The Earl of March and S.C.H. Davis won the event outright in an Austin Seven.

From June 1935 the BRDC published the monthly magazine Speed. The final issue was April 1939, after which it was incorporated into its rival Motor Sport.

World War II and aftermath
Members who died or were killed during the Second World War included: Cecil Kimber (a vice-president), The Earl of Cottenham, A.V. Ebblewhite, Hugh P. McConnell, T.E. Rose Richards, J.P. Wakefield, E.K. Rayson, G.L. Baker, John Carr, Percy Maclure, A.F.P. Fane, B.P.W. Twist, R.O. Shuttleworth, C.S. Staniland, N.G. Wilson, H.E. Symons, R.P. Hichens, J.A. Driskell, and Lionel Martin.

After the war the club opened a "Le Mans Fund," for the benefit of the Automobile Club de l'Ouest, raising a grand total of £358 and 11 shillings, to assist with the rehabilitation of the facilities at the Le Mans circuit. "It will be remembered that these installations were almost completely destroyed during the war, mainly by Allied bombing."

Membership status
In the modern era full membership status is offered only to those who are judged to have been successful at an international level for a number of seasons. Full membership has been awarded to every British or Commonwealth Formula One World Champion. Associate status is awarded to those who have made a significant contribution to motor sport. Honorary membership may be awarded in special cases, such as a notable World Champion who may not otherwise qualify. Membership is only open to British or Commonwealth drivers however Irish drivers who were born in the Irish Free State or the Republic of Ireland before 1950 would be considered British by the club and eligible for membership. This rule allowed for Eddie Jordan to join the club. Once invited to join, prospective members must be proposed and seconded by existing members, then in turn, approved by the existing membership, board of directors and BRDC President.

The BRDC's membership was initially restricted to experienced and successful male drivers, and was by invitation only. When Le Mans-winner John Duff joined the club in 1935 he was proposed and seconded by existing members. However James Robertson Justice was a member of the club, with a limited track record.

In 1946 eligibility was described thus: "It is pointed out that, normally, membership is confined to gentlemen who have competed in an open motor road-racing event or taken a first, second or third place award in a Brooklands Automobile Racing Club's Meeting. Every candidate must be proposed by one and seconded by another member of the club, to both of whom he is personally known."

Women have been elected Honorary Member of the Club since 1928, however it was not until 1994 that they were able to become Full Members. As a consequence, the British Women Racing Drivers Club was founded in 1962 by Mary Wheeler.

Race promotion and circuit ownership
In the post-war era, the BRDC expanded its activities, taking over the lease of Silverstone from the RAC in 1952. In 1966, the club formed a subsidiary company, Silverstone Circuits Limited, responsible for the development of the British Grand Prix and – after its purchase in 1971 – the circuit itself. Aside from the GP, other notable BRDC-organised events at Silverstone included the BRDC International Trophy.

In recent years, Silverstone and the British GP have become an ongoing contentious issue between the BRDC board and Bernie Ecclestone's Formula One Management, with differences of opinion over the costs involved and the state of the circuit's infrastructure.

Also within the remit of the club are:
The BRDC Marshals' Club.
BRDC Club Races.
BRDC 500 Summer Races.
The BRDC Walter Hayes Trophy.

Young driver support
The support and development of young British drivers has become an important part of the BRDC's existence, not least with its involvement in the annual McLaren Autosport BRDC Award to honour and promote a young driver from a British championship who, in the eyes of the judges, shows the most talent and potential. Among the BRDC's promotional and developmental schemes is the Stars of Tomorrow karting championship. The BRDC also provides financial backing to selected young British drivers competing in junior formulae.

In 2008, the BRDC announced the creation of its SuperStars program, designed to advise and financially support Britain's most promising young drivers. 1992 BTCC champion Tim Harvey was appointed Director of the program. The current director is Andy Meyrick.

2022 BRDC Superstars

Significant people
In the recent past the Club Presidency has been held by former Formula One World Champions Sir Jackie Stewart and Damon Hill. , Former F1 Driver David Coulthard is the President of the BRDC, having replaced Paddy Hopkirk.

The club's current Chairman is John Grant, since 2012.  The position has recently been held by former touring car driver Stuart Rolt, (from 2005 – 2008 and from 2010 – 2012) and Robert Brooks, Chairman of Bonhams auctioneers, from 2008 – 2010.

Presidents of the BRDC

See also
 Automobile Club de l'Ouest
 British Automobile Racing Club
 British Racing and Sports Car Club
 British Women Racing Drivers Club

References

External links
Official website
Silverstone Racing Club

Motorsport organisations in the United Kingdom
Professional associations based in the United Kingdom
1928 establishments in the United Kingdom
Sports organizations established in 1928